Gema is a given name. Notable people with the name include:

Gema Alava (born 1973), Spanish artist
Gema Climent (born 1971), Spanish psychologist
Gema Hassen-Bey (born 1967), Spanish wheelchair fencer 
Gema León (born 1991), Mexican volleyball player
Gema Martínez López (born 1950), Mexican politician
Gema Pascual (born 1979), Spanish cyclist
Gema Peris (born 1983), Spanish weightlifter
Gema Ramkeesoon (born 1999), Trinidadian and Tobagonian social worker and women's rights activist 
Gema Sevillano (1972–2019), Spanish Paralympic swimmer and paratriathlete
Gema Simon (born 1990), Australian soccer player
Gema Zamprogna (born 1976), Canadian actress
Gema Zúñiga (born 1993), Nicaraguan footballer

See also
Gemma (given name)